Holaspis guentheri, commonly known as the sawtail lizard or western neon blue-tailed tree lizard  is a species of lizard occurring in Sierra Leone, Ghana, Nigeria, Cameroon, Gabon, Equatorial Guinea, Democratic Republic of the Congo, Central African Republic, Uganda, Angola, Tanzania, Malawi, Mozambique, Ivory Coast, Benin, and Togo.

Etymology
The species is named in honor of Albert Günther.

References

Holaspis
Reptiles described in 1863
Taxa named by John Edward Gray